Jasmin Šćuk (born 14 July 1990) is a Bosnian footballer.

Club career
Šćuk was part of the youth team of FK Mladá Boleslav before breaking into the first team in November 2010. He signed for Slavia Prague in 2016 after his contract at Mladá Boleslav had run out. He scored his first competitive goal for Slavia on 12 April 2017 in a 5–2 Czech FA Cup win against Karviná.

Following 3 season spent in BB Erzurumspor with 96 games played across all competitions and 10 goals scored, Scuk joined İzmir-based Altay S.K. on 8 August 2020.

References

External links
 

1990 births
People from Jablanica, Bosnia and Herzegovina
Living people
Bosnia and Herzegovina footballers
Bosnia and Herzegovina youth international footballers
Association football midfielders
FK Mladá Boleslav players
SK Slavia Prague players
Büyükşehir Belediye Erzurumspor footballers
Altay S.K. footballers
Czech First League players
TFF First League players
Süper Lig players
Bosnia and Herzegovina expatriate footballers
Expatriate footballers in the Czech Republic
Bosnia and Herzegovina expatriate sportspeople in the Czech Republic
Expatriate footballers in Turkey
Bosnia and Herzegovina expatriate sportspeople in Turkey